The results of the 2021 Little League World Series were determined during August 19–29, 2021, in South Williamsport, Pennsylvania. A total of 16 teams from the United States were divided into two groups of eight teams, with both groups playing a modified double-elimination tournament. In each group, the last remaining undefeated team faced the last remaining team with one loss, with the winners of those games advancing to play for the Little League World Series championship. The two eight-team tournament brackets were named after Major League Baseball players and National Baseball Hall of Fame inductees Hank Aaron and Tom Seaver, who died in January 2021 and August 2020, respectively.

Double-elimination stage

Hank Aaron

Winner's bracket

Game 1: Hawaii 9, Connecticut 1

Game 3: Nebraska 5, New Jersey 2

Game 6: Michigan 8, Florida 0

Game 8: Texas 6, Washington 0

Game 14: Hawaii 11, Nebraska 3

Game 15: Michigan 6, Texas 5

Game 24: Hawaii 2, Michigan 0

Loser's bracket

Game 10: New Jersey 11, Connecticut 4

Game 11: Washington 1, Florida 0

Game 17: Texas 2, New Jersey 1

Game 20: Nebraska 3, Washington 2

Game 22: Texas 10, Nebraska 0

Game 25: Michigan 15, Texas 6

Tom Seaver

Winner's bracket

Game 2: Ohio 1, Tennessee 0

Game 4: California 10, New Hampshire 2

Game 5: Oregon 8, Pennsylvania 2

Game 7: South Dakota 2, Louisiana 0

Game 13: California 9, Ohio 0

Game 16: South Dakota 3, Oregon 0

Game 23: South Dakota 1, California 0

Loser's bracket

Game 9: New Hampshire 4, Tennessee 1

Game 12: Louisiana 5, Pennsylvania 3

Game 18: New Hampshire 14, Oregon 6

Game 19: Ohio 8, Louisiana 2

Game 21: Ohio 4, New Hampshire 3

Game 26: Ohio 4, California 2

Single-elimination stage

Tom Seaver championship: Ohio 5, South Dakota 2

Hank Aaron championship: Michigan 2, Hawaii 1

Consolation game: Hawaii 5, South Dakota 0

World championship game: Michigan 5, Ohio 2

References

External links
Full schedule from littleleague.org

2021 Little League World Series